Erihana Rupene Ryan is a New Zealand psychiatrist.

Biography
Ryan was born in Tuahiwi, and lived on the marae there until the age of 17. She was the fourth child of eight born to Te Marino (a freezing works worker of the Ngāi Tahu tribe) and Bernice Reuben (a Pākehā homemaker). She left high school after four years to work as a hospital laboratory assistant, then seven years later applied for support from the Ngāi Tahu Māori Trust Board to attend medical school. On graduating, she moved to Wellington and worked at Porirua Hospital in general medicine before deciding to specialise in psychiatry. In the 1980s Ryan was involved in the Mason Inquiries with Ken Mason and also worked for the Waitangi Tribunal.

In the early 1990s Ryan moved to Christchurch and was appointed the clinical director of Te Korowai Atawhai, the Māori mental health team in Christchurch. In 1996 she was appointed to the board of Ngāi Tahu Development Corporation, and the following year she became chair. In 2001 she was appointed to the Ministry of Health's Health Workforce Advisory Committee.

Recognition 
In 2004, Ryan received the Dr Maarire Goodall Award acknowledging her contributions to Māori health.

References

Living people
Ngāi Tahu people
New Zealand psychiatrists
New Zealand women psychiatrists
People from Tuahiwi
Year of birth missing (living people)